STFU may refer to:
 "Shut the fuck up", an expletive

Music
 "STFU", a 2022 song by Neck Deep
 "STFU!", a 2019 song by Rina Sawayama
 "STFU", a 2014 song by Kim Petras
 "STFU", a 2019 song by Julie Bergan
 "STFU", a song by Pink Guy from the 2017 album Pink Season
 "STFU", a song by Rico Nasty from the 2020 album Nightmare Vacation

Other uses
 Southern Tenant Farmers Union, a civil farmer's union
 Southern Tenant Folk Union, a musical band

See also
 Shut up (disambiguation)
 Shut the fuck up (disambiguation)